Downtown West can refer to:

Downtown West, Minneapolis
Downtown West, St. Louis
Downtown West End, Calgary
Downtown West (Gary)